A character actor is a supporting actor known for small parts who plays unusual, interesting, or eccentric characters. The term, often contrasted with that of leading actor, is somewhat abstract and open to interpretation. In a literal sense, all actors can be considered character actors since they all play "characters", but the term more commonly refers to an actor who frequently plays a distinctive and important supporting role. Character actors are generally well-known and recognizable by the audience (by appearance if not by name), even if they play different types of roles in different movies. 

A character actor may play characters who are very different from the actor's off-screen real-life personality, while in another sense a character actor may be one who specializes in minor roles. In either case, character-actor roles are more substantial than bit parts or non-speaking extras. 

The term is used primarily to describe television and film actors, as opposed to those in the theater. An early use of the term was in the 1883 edition of The Stage, which defined a character actor as "one who portrays individualities and eccentricities". Actors with a long career history of playing character roles may be difficult for audiences to recognize as being the same actor.

Overview

In contrast to leading actors, they are generally seen as less glamorous. While a leading actor often has the physical attractiveness considered necessary to play the love interest, a character actor typically does not. In fact, some character actors are known for their unusual looks. For example, Chicago character actor William Schutz's face was disfigured in a car accident when he was five years old, but his appearance after reconstructive surgery helped him to be distinctive to theater audiences. Generally, the names of character actors are not featured prominently in movie and television advertising on the marquee, since a character actor's name is not expected to attract film audiences. Some character actors have been described as instantly recognizable despite their names being little known.

During the course of an acting career, an actor can sometimes shift between leading roles and secondary roles. Some leading actors, as they get older, find that access to leading roles is limited by their age. Sometimes character actors have developed careers based on specific talents needed in genre films, such as dancing, horsemanship, acrobatics, swimming ability, or boxing. Many up-and-coming actors find themselves typecast in character roles due to an early success with a particular part or in a certain genre, such that the actor becomes so strongly identified with a particular type of role that casting directors and theatrical agents steer the actor to similar roles. Some character actors are known as "chameleons", able to play roles that vary wildly, such as Gary Oldman. Some character actors develop a cult following.

Character actors tend to play the same type of role throughout their careers, such as Harvey Keitel as tough and determined; Christopher Lloyd as an eccentric; Claude Rains as sophisticated, sometimes morally ambiguous men; Abe Vigoda as an aging criminal; Fairuza Balk as moody goth girls; Doug Jones playing non-human creatures; and Forest Whitaker as composed characters with underlying volatility. Ed Lauter usually portrayed a menacing figure because of his "long, angular face", which was easily recognized in public, although audiences rarely knew his name. Character actors can play a variety of types, such as the femme fatale, gunslinger, sidekick, town drunk, villain, hooker with a heart of gold, and many others. A character actor's roles are often substantially different from their real-life persona. Good character actors, such as Margo Martindale, are rarely out of work, and they often have long careers that span decades. They are often highly esteemed by fellow actors.

See also
 Commedia dell'arte
 Stock character
 Typecasting

References

Further reading
 
 

Acting
Film and video terminology